Tadej (Thaddeus) of Vitovnica (10 October 1914 – 13 April 2003) was a Serbian Orthodox elder and published author, credited for proposing the idea that our thoughts determine the outcome of our lives. He was a hegumen of the Vitovnica monastery and a spiritual father.

Biography
Elder Thaddeus was born in 1914 in the village of Vitovnica as Tomislav Štrbulović, the son of working class parents.  He became a monk in 1935 in the Gornjak monastery. On July 14 that same year, he became a hierodeacon. He was given the title of hieromonk on 3 February 1938 in the Rakovica monastery. He became a hegumen in 1949 in St. Michael's Cathedral in Belgrade.

Elder Thaddeus was a hegumen at the Vitovnica monastery from 14 April 1962 until the end of March in 1972. After that he was a hegumen at Pokajnica monastery in Velika Plana, and after that he was a hegumen at Tuman monastery. He then became a hegumen at the Vitovnica monastery for the second time. He gained the rank of archimandrite in 1989 at the Gornjak monastery in front of the relics of knyaz Lazar of Serbia.

Published books
 Kakve su ti misli, takav ti je život (Our Thoughts Determine our Lives), 2004

References

External links
 The life of Archimandrite Tadej

1914 births
2003 deaths
People from Petrovac, Serbia
People from the Kingdom of Serbia
Serbian Orthodox clergy
Archimandrites
Ascetics
Clairvoyants
Folk saints
Hegumens
Starets
Burials at Serbian Orthodox monasteries and churches